Pelvo d'Elva is a mountain in the Cottian Alps, in eastern Piedmont, northern Italy.

Dividing the Varaita and Maira Valleys, it is located across the communal territory of Elva and Bellino.

Mountains of Piedmont
Alpine three-thousanders